James Paul Lake (born December 17, 1976) is an American football coach who is the assistant head coach for the Los Angeles Rams of the National Football League (NFL). He was most recently the head coach at the University of Washington, from 2020 to 2021. Lake has coached at both the National Football League (NFL) and college football levels, primarily overseeing defensive backs. Lake played college football as a strong safety at Eastern Washington from 1995–1998.

Early years
A military brat, Lake was born in Walnut Creek, California; his father served in the U.S. Air Force and the family lived in various locations, including overseas tours in Turkey and the Philippines. He attended North Central High School in Spokane, Washington, was a three-sport letterman for the Indians (football, basketball, and baseball), and was recognized as a scholar-athlete.

Lake played college football for Eastern Washington University in nearby Cheney as a strong safety from 1995 to 1998, where he was an honorable-mention All-Big Sky recipient, team captain, and named to the All-Big Sky Conference Academic Team. After graduating from Eastern Washington in 1999, Lake worked as a graduate assistant there during the spring before taking a full-time job with the Spokane Indians, a minor league baseball team, where he worked in ticket sales.

Coaching career
Lake returned to coaching for the 2000 season when Eastern Washington hired him as their defensive backs coach, replacing Randy Hanson. Lake stayed at Eastern Washington until 2004 when the University of Washington, located in Seattle, hired him as defensive backs coach. The job change moved him to the western side of the state for the first time and up to the Football Bowl Subdivision (then called Division I-A). At Washington, he coached under defensive coordinator Phil Snow, who Lake called a "defensive back guru." The Huskies won a single game in 2004, leading to the dismissal of head coach Keith Gilbertson and his staff. Lake landed at Montana State University in Bozeman, Montana, under defensive coordinator Pete Kwiatkowski and head coach Mike Kramer, both of whom had been at Eastern Washington during Lake's playing days.

Following the 2005 season, Lake interviewed with Washington before accepting a job with the Tampa Bay Buccaneers in the National Football League as assistant defensive backs coach, working with defensive coordinator Monte Kiffin under head coach Jon Gruden. Lake left after two years to coach defensive backs with the Detroit Lions, one of several Bucs assistants hired away by head coach Rod Marinelli, a long-time defensive line coach at Tampa Bay. The move reunited him with Snow, who had been in Detroit for several years coaching the linebackers. The 2008 Detroit Lions infamously went winless, the first NFL team to do so since the season expanded to 16 games, leading to the dismissal of Marinelli and his staff.

Lake returned to Tampa Bay for the 2010 and 2011 seasons as defensive backs coach under Raheem Morris, who had replaced Gruden as head coach in 2009.

Boise State
In 2012 and 2013 Lake worked as the defensive backs coach for Boise State.

Washington
Lake joined the Washington Huskies staff in 2014 as a defensive backs coach under head coach Chris Petersen. This was his second stint at the school after serving one year under Keith Gilbertson in 2004. In 2016, he was promoted to co-defensive coordinator. On December 2, 2019, Petersen announced he would step down as Washington's head coach at the end of the 2019 season, and Lake would be his successor. Washington suspended Lake without pay on November 8, 2021, after he shoved one of his players the previous weekend. Washington fired Lake on November 14. Washington did not choose to fire him for cause, and will pay his $9.9 million buyout. Defensive coordinator Bob Gregory replaced Lake as interim head coach. Lake's tenure as Washington's head coach was tumultuous and full of issues both on and off the field.

Los Angeles Rams
On February 16, 2023, Lake was hired as a defensive assistant by the Los Angeles Rams.

Head coaching record

References

External links
 Washington profile

1976 births
Living people
American football defensive backs
Boise State Broncos football coaches
Detroit Lions coaches
Eastern Washington Eagles football coaches
Eastern Washington Eagles football players
Los Angeles Rams coaches
Montana State Bobcats football coaches
Tampa Bay Buccaneers coaches
Washington Huskies football coaches
Sportspeople from Walnut Creek, California
Coaches of American football from Washington (state)
Players of American football from Spokane, Washington
African-American coaches of American football
African-American players of American football
21st-century African-American sportspeople
20th-century African-American sportspeople